Histone demethylase UTY is an enzyme that in humans is encoded by the UTY gene.

This gene encodes a protein containing tetratricopeptide repeats which are thought to be involved in protein–protein interactions. This protein is a minor histocompatibility antigen which may induce graft rejection of male stem cell grafts. Alternative splicing results in multiple transcript variants encoding different isoforms.

Interactions 

UTY has been shown to interact with TLE1 and WDR90.

References

Further reading